Qarah Gonay or Qareh Gonay, also rendered as Qarah Guni or Qareh Guney, may refer to:
 Qarah Gonay-e Olya
 Qarah Gonay-e Sofla
 Qarah Gonay-e Vosta

See also
 Qareh Guni (disambiguation)